The following is a chronological list of nonlinear narrative films.

2020s

2010s

2000s

2009

2008

2007

2006
". Sight & Sound. Retrieved on January 15, 2011.</ref>

2005

2004

2003

2002

2001

2000

1990s

1999

1998

1997

1996

1995

1990–1994

1980s

1970s

1960s

1950s

1910s – 1940s

See also 
 Nonlinear narrative
 Nonlinear gameplay
 Reverse chronology
 Hypertext fiction
 Hyperlink cinema
 Lists of films
 List of non-narrative feature films

References

External links 
 Linear writing for non-linear films at JohnAugust.com

Nonlinear narrative